The Mittelweg ("Middle Way") is a north–south long-distance path which runs through the Black Forest from Pforzheim to Waldshut. It is about 230 kilometres long and was established in  1903. Since then it has been maintained and sponsored by the Black Forest Club. Its waymark is a red diamond with a white bar on a white background.

Description 
From Pforzheim the path initially runs over the plateau between the Enz and Nagold valleys. Passing the raised bogs of the Northern Black Forest it goes to Freudenstadt and continues through the Central Black Forest via the Fohrenbühl and St. Georgen to the Hochfirst. In the Southern Black Forest the ‘’Mittelweg’’ passes through the valleys of the Schwarza and Schlücht (western branch) or Mettma (eastern branch) and reaches the  High Rhine at Waldshut.

Route

Common stages: Pforzheim – Lenzkirch

1st Stage: Pforzheim – Bad Wildbad 
 Distance: 23 km
 Journey time: c. 5.5 hours

2nd Stage: Bad Wildbad – Besenfeld 
 Distance: 31 km
 Journey time: c. 8 hours

3rd Stage: Besenfeld – Oberzwieselberg 
 Distance: 26 km
 Journey time: c. 6.5 hours

4th Stage: Oberzwieselberg – Schiltach 
 Distance: 25 km
 Journey time: c. 6 hours

5th Stage: Schiltach – St. Georgen 
 Distance: 30.5 km
 Journey time: c. 7.5 hours

6th Stage: St. Georgen – Kalte Herberge 
 Distance: 25.5 km
 Journey time: c. 6.5 hours

7th Stage: Kalte Herberge – Lenzkirch 
 Distance: 25.5 km
 Journey time: c. 6.5 hours

Western branch: Lenzkirch – Waldshut

8th Stage: Lenzkirch – Häusern 
 Distance: 20 km
 Journey time: c. 5 hours

9th Stage: Häusern – Waldshut 
 Distance: 23 km
 Journey time: c. 5.5 hours

Eastern branch: Lenzkirch – Waldshut

8th Stage: Lenzkirch – Rothaus 
 Distance: 13 km
 Journey time: c. 3.5 hours

9th Stage: Rothaus – Waldshut 
 Distance: 30 km
 Journey time: c. 7 hours

External links 
 Black Forest Hiking Service: web service of the Black Forest Club enabling visualisation of the Black Forest trails on Google Maps with various overlays (trail network, signs, accommodation, ...)

Hiking trails in Baden-Württemberg
Transport in the Black Forest